Michael Videira (born 6 January 1986 in Milford, Massachusetts) is an American soccer player.

Career

Youth and College
Videira attended Noble & Greenough School, where he was a Parade and McDonald's high school All-American and the Gatorade Massachusetts Player of the Year as a junior, and played club soccer for the Greater Boston Bolts club team, where he played for Revolution assistant coach Paul Mariner alongside teammate Chris Tierney.

He played college soccer at Duke University, where he was a three-time semifinalist for the Hermann Trophy in 2005, 2006 and 2007, and was an NSCAA Third-Team All-American in both 2006 and 2007. Videira was also a four-time All-ACC selection and four-time NSCAA All-South honoree, was voted the ACC All-Tournament MVP as a junior, and was Soccer America's national freshman of the year in 2004.

During his college years, Videira also played with Cary RailHawks U23s in the USL Premier Development League.

Professional
Videira was drafted in the second round (18th overall) of the 2008 MLS SuperDraft by New England Revolution, but chose not to sign an MLS contract, and instead went to Scotland, signing with Scottish Premier League side Hamilton Academical. Videira did not make any first-team appearances for the Accies because of a string of injuries, and after being released from his contract in December 2008, finally signed with Revolution. He made his professional debut on 25 April 2009, in New England's game against Real Salt Lake.

During 2009 Videira also briefly spent time on loan with Western Mass Pioneers in the USL Second Division.

Videira was released by New England on 26 July 2010, and subsequently signed for AC St. Louis of the USSF Division 2 Pro League, eventually making 8 appearances for the team in the one and only season.

After AC St. Louis folded, Videira trialled with Chicago Fire during their 2011 pre-season and was eventually signed by the Major League Soccer club on 10 March 2011.

International
Videira is a former member of both the United States Under-17 and Under-20 teams, and played in the Croix International Tournament in Spain in 2003 and in the Milk Cup in Northern Ireland in 2003 and 2005.

References

External links
 
 AC St. Louis bio

1986 births
Living people
People from Milford, Massachusetts
Sportspeople from Worcester County, Massachusetts
Soccer players from Massachusetts
American soccer players
Duke Blue Devils men's soccer players
North Carolina FC U23 players
Cary Clarets players
Hamilton Academical F.C. players
New England Revolution players
Western Mass Pioneers players
AC St. Louis players
Chicago Fire FC players
Major League Soccer players
USL League Two players
USL Second Division players
USSF Division 2 Professional League players
American people of Portuguese descent
United States men's youth international soccer players
United States men's under-20 international soccer players
New England Revolution draft picks
Association football midfielders